Jo Ryon-sik (born 30 January 1960) is a North Korean boxer. He competed in the men's flyweight event at the 1980 Summer Olympics.

References

External links
 

1960 births
Living people
North Korean male boxers
Olympic boxers of North Korea
Boxers at the 1980 Summer Olympics
Place of birth missing (living people)
Asian Games medalists in boxing
Boxers at the 1982 Asian Games
Asian Games gold medalists for North Korea
Medalists at the 1982 Asian Games
Featherweight boxers